Sarah ("Renk") Thorsett (born March 18, 1970) is a retired middle distance runner from the United States, who competed in the 1990s for her alma mater, the University of Wisconsin, Madison, and for the United States. As a collegiate runner, she was a six time All American, and a member of two national champion 4x800 meter relay teams. She was the winner of the women's 1,500 meters race at the 1995 Pan American Games, and set her personal best time in that event (4:05.87) on 1996-07-10 at a meet in Nice, France. She twice competed as a member of her national team at World Championship events. She was inducted into the USA Track and Field Minnesota Hall of Fame in 2007.

Achievements

References

 
Profile

1970 births
Living people
American female middle-distance runners
Pan American Games gold medalists for the United States
Pan American Games medalists in athletics (track and field)
Athletes (track and field) at the 1995 Pan American Games
Medalists at the 1995 Pan American Games
21st-century American women